Osteochilus melanopleura is a cyprinid freshwater fish from Southeast Asia. It inhabits rivers, swamps, and marshlands, and is adapted to impounded waters and seasonally flooded habitats. It is found in the Mekong River and Chao Phraya River and elsewhere in most countries in Indochina as well as in Sumatra and Borneo. It is eaten as a foodfish and is often processed into fermented products. It grows to  SL.

References

Osteochilus
Fish described in 1852
Taxa named by Pieter Bleeker
Fish of the Mekong Basin
Fish of Cambodia
Freshwater fish of Indonesia
Fish of Laos
Freshwater fish of Malaysia
Fish of Singapore
Fish of Thailand
Fish of Vietnam
Freshwater fish of Borneo
Freshwater fish of Sumatra